Sodium tetrachloroaurate is an inorganic compound with the chemical formula NaAuCl4. It is composed of the ions Na+ and AuCl4−. It exists in the anhydrous and dihydrate states. At room temperature, it exists as a golden-orange solid. The anhydrous and dihydrate forms are available commercially.

Preparation  
The conventional method of preparation of sodium tetrachloroaurate involves the addition of tetrachloroauric acid solution to sodium chloride or sodium carbonate to form a mixture. The mixture is stirred at 100 °C, and then subjected to evaporation, cooling, crystallization, and drying to obtain the orange crystals of sodium tetrachloroaurate.

However, more efficient preparation methods have been discovered recently. These are the addition of gold with sodium oxy-halogen salts and hydrochloric acid.

Uses 
It is used in a wide range of applications. For example, it is used as a catalyst for the hydrochlorination of acetylene, or the oxidation of sulfides.

References

Gold(III) compounds
Inorganic compounds
Chlorometallates